Crow is a ghost town in Phillips County, Kansas, United States.  GPS link on this page goes to 'Crow, Harrison Township, Jewell County, Kansas.'

History
Crow was issued a post office in 1881. The post office was discontinued in 1901.

References

Former populated places in Phillips County, Kansas
Former populated places in Kansas